Lutsharel Geertruida (born 18 July 2000) is a Dutch professional footballer who plays as a right-back for Eredivisie club Feyenoord.

Club career
Geertruida made his professional first team debut on 25 October 2017 in the second round of the 2017–18 KNVB Cup against AVV Swift, coming on as a substitute in the 77th minute. He scored his first goal in professional football on 27 September 2020, scoring Feyenoord's first goal in a 4-2 win against ADO Den Haag.

International career
Born in the Netherlands, Geertruida is of Curaçaoan descent. He is a youth international for the Netherlands.

On 21 March 2021, Geertruida was called up to the Netherlands national under-21 football team for the 2021 UEFA European Under-21 Championship to replace the ill Jurriën Timber.

He was called up to the preliminary squad for the Curaçao national team for the 2021 CONCACAF Gold Cup.

On 17 March 2023, Geertruida received his first call-up to the Netherlands senior national team for the Euro 2024 qualifying matches against France and Gibraltar.

Career statistics

Honours
Feyenoord
 KNVB Cup: 2017–18
 Johan Cruyff Shield: 2018
 UEFA Europa Conference League runner-up: 2021–22

Individual
Eredivisie Talent of the Month: September 2020, January 2021
Eredivisie Team of the Month: September 2020, January 2021, February 2023
 UEFA Europa Conference League Team of the Season: 2021–22

References

External links
 Career stats - Voetbal International

2000 births
Living people
Footballers from Rotterdam
Dutch people of Curaçao descent
Association football defenders
Dutch footballers
Netherlands under-21 international footballers
Netherlands youth international footballers
Feyenoord players
Eredivisie players